D.020 is a west to east state road in Turkey running both on  Europe and Asia. It starts in Edirne East at the State road D.100 junction near İskender village, and ends in Adapazarı with interruption on the Istanbul Strait. The European part ends in Hasdal at Otoyol 2, and it begins again on the Asian part in Sultanbeyli.

Itinerary 
{| class="wikitable"
!rowspan="2" |Province
!rowspan="2" |Location
!colspan="3" |Distance from (km)
|-
!previous location
!Ipsala
!Kınalı
|-
|rowspan="2" style="text-align:left;" |Edirne 
|Edirne East  junction ||0 ||0 ||455
|-
|Hasköy, Edirne ||20 ||20 ||435
|-
|rowspan="4" style="text-align:left;" |Kırklareli 
|İnece ||19 ||39 ||416
|-
|Kırklareli ||16 ||55 ||400
|-
|Pınarhisar ||28 ||83 ||372
|-
|Vize ||25 ||108 ||347
|-
|rowspan="1" style="text-align:left;" |Tekirdağ
|Saray ||21 ||129 ||326
|-
|rowspan="2" style="text-align:left;" |Istanbul
|Hasdal  junction||118 ||247 ||208
|-
|Sultanbeyli || - ||247 ||208
|-
|rowspan="1" style="text-align:left;" |Kocaeli
|Kandıra ||129 ||376 ||79
|-
|rowspan="2" style="text-align:left;" |Sakarya
|Kaynarca, Sakarya ||17 ||393 ||62
|-
|Adapazarı ||62 ||455 ||0

Intersections

References 

020
Transport in Edirne Province
Transport in Kırklareli Province
Transport in Tekirdağ Province
Transport in Istanbul Province
Transport in Kocaeli Province
Transport in Sakarya Province